The year 2023 is the 12th year in the history of the Absolute Championship Akhmat, a mixed martial arts promotion based in Russia. 2023 will begin with ACA 151.

2023 Grands Prix 
ACA President Mayrbek Khasiev recently revealed that the promotion will run Grand Prix across all their weight classes, with a total prize pool of $10 million.

ACA Lightweight Grand Prix 

The prize fund of the Grand Prix in a lightweight division will be 800.000 dollars, this was announced by the founder of the ACA league Mairbek Khasiev, with the winner of the GP getting a cash prize of $200,000.

Participants: Alain Ilunga, Ali Bagov, Yusuf Raisov, Hacran Dias, Artem Reznikov,  Eduard Vartanyan, Davi Ramos
Rashid Magomedov and Ali Bagov fought at ACA 141. However the bout ended in a no contest due to the president of ACA stopping the bout due to inactivity. Both were eliminated from the tournament.

2023 ACA Heavyweight Grand Prix 

*Francimar Barroso was unable to fight the day of the bout and no replacement was found.

2023 ACA Light Heavyweight Grand Prix

2023 ACA Middleweight Grand Prix

2023 ACA Welterweight Grand Prix

2023 ACA Featherweight Grand Prix

2023 ACA Bantamweight Grand Prix

2023 ACA Flyweight Grand Prix

ACA 151: Abiltarov vs Gomes

Absolute Championship Akhmat 151: Abiltarov vs Gomes was a mixed martial arts event held by Absolute Championship Akhmat on January 27, 2023 in Kazan, Tatarstan, Russia.

Background

The event will be the first of the year for ACA and will be headlined by a flyweight bout between Ruslan Abiltarov and Alan Gomes.

Bonus awards:

The following fighters were awarded bonuses:
$50,000 Performance of the Night: 
$25,000 Performance of the Night: 
$5000 Stoppage Victory Bonuses:

Results

ACA 152: Bukuev vs Gadzhiev

Absolute Championship Akhmat 152: Bukuev vs Gadzhiev was a mixed martial arts event held by Absolute Championship Akhmat on February 25, 2023 at the Sports Hall Coliseum in Grozny, Russia.

Background

Bonus awards:

The following fighters were awarded bonuses:
$50,000 Performance of the Night: 
$25,000 Performance of the Night: 
$5000 Stoppage Victory Bonuses:

Results

ACA 153: Dzhanaev vs. Pessoa

Absolute Championship Akhmat 153: Dzhanaev vs. Pessoa was a mixed martial arts event held by Absolute Championship Akhmat on March 9, 2023 at the CSKA Arena in Moscow, Russia.

Background

Bonus awards:

The following fighters were awarded bonuses:
$50,000 Performance of the Night: 
$25,000 Performance of the Night: 
$5000 Stoppage Victory Bonuses:

Results

ACA 154: Vakhaev vs Goncharov

Absolute Championship Akhmat 154: Vakhaev vs Goncharov was a mixed martial arts event held by Absolute Championship Akhmat on March 17, 2023 at the Basket-Hall Krasnodar in Krasnodar, Russia.

Background

Bonus awards:

The following fighters were awarded bonuses:
$50,000 Performance of the Night: 
$25,000 Performance of the Night: 
$5000 Stoppage Victory Bonuses:

Results

ACA 155: Karginov	vs. Silva

Absolute Championship Akhmat 155: Karginov	vs. Silva was a mixed martial arts event held by Absolute Championship Akhmat on April 9, 2023 at the Falcon Club Arena in Minsk, Belarus.

Background

Bonus awards:

The following fighters were awarded bonuses:
$50,000 Performance of the Night: 
$25,000 Performance of the Night: 
$5000 Stoppage Victory Bonuses:

Results

ACA 156: Koshkin vs Boyko

Absolute Championship Akhmat 156: Koshkin vs Boyko was a mixed martial arts event held by Absolute Championship Akhmat on April 28, 2023 at the CSKA Arena in Moscow, Russia.

Background

Bonus awards:

The following fighters were awarded bonuses:
$50,000 Performance of the Night: 
$25,000 Performance of the Night: 
$5000 Stoppage Victory Bonuses:

Results

ACA 159: Vartanyan vs Reznikov

Absolute Championship Akhmat 159: Vartanyan vs Reznikov was a mixed martial arts event held by Absolute Championship Akhmat on June 16, 2023 at the in Sochi, Russia.

Background

Bonus awards:

The following fighters were awarded bonuses:
$50,000 Performance of the Night: 
$25,000 Performance of the Night: 
$5000 Stoppage Victory Bonuses:

Results

See also
List of current ACA fighters
 2023 in UFC
 2023 in Bellator MMA
 2023 in ONE Championship
 2023 in Konfrontacja Sztuk Walki
 2023 in Rizin Fighting Federation
 2023 in AMC Fight Nights
 2023 in Brave Combat Federation
 2023 in Road FC
 2023 Professional Fighters League season
 2023 in Eagle Fighting Championship
 2023 in Legacy Fighting Alliance

References

External links
ACA

Absolute Championship Akhmat
Absolute Championship Berkut events
2023 in mixed martial arts